Gherardo Bosio (19 March 1903 – 16 April 1941) was an Italian architect, engineer and urbanist, famed for his work in planning the centre of Tirana, the capital of Albania.

Biography 
Bosio pursued a degree in Engineering in Rome in 1926 and subsequently graduated from the University of Florence School of Architecture in 1931.

After the conquest of Italian East Africa in 1936, Bosio was dispatched by the Italian authorities to Ethiopia, where he prepared the masterplans for the Ethiopian cities of Gondar and Dessie.

Gherardo Bosio died of cancer at the age of 38, on 16 April 1941, at his villa in Montefonti, Florence.

Summary of works 
 Renovation and extension to Villa Acton, Florence, 1927–29
 Project in the Competition for the Christopher Columbus Memorial Lighthouse, Santo Domingo, 1928–29
 Restoration, expansion and furniture design for Casa Uzielli, Florence, 1929–32
 Sisters of the Blue Chapel on Via Cherubini, Florence, 1930–31
 Furniture design for Casa Maraini, Florence, 1932
 Project of Nursing Home on Viale dei Colli, Florence, 1932
  Furniture design for Casa Traballesi, Florence, 1933
 Villa Ginori Conti, Cerreto di Pomarance, 1934
 Ugolino Golf House, Impruneta, 1934 (in collaboration with Pier Luigi Nervi)
 Furniture design for the Italian Institute of Culture, Budapest, 1935
 Restoration and furnishing of the offices of the Monsavano company, Pontassieve, 1935
 Restoration and furnishing of Villa Pandolfini, Tizzano San Polo, 1935
 Furnishing for the Foreign Ministry, Rome, 1935–37
 Furniture design for Casa Della Gherardesca, Florence, 1936
 Project for the Masterplan of Gondar, Italian East Africa, 1936
 Project for the Masterplan of Dessie, Italian East Africa, 1936
 Project for the Masterplan of Tirana, Albania, 1939
 "Martyrs of the Nation" Boulevard, Tirana, Albania, 1939–41 
 Grand Hotel Dajti, Tirana, Albania, 1939–41 
 Casa del Fascio, Tirana, Albania 1939–41
 Palazzo della Luogotenenza (now housing the Office of the Prime Minister), Tirana, Albania 1939–41
 Presidential Palace, Tirana, Albania 1939–41

Bibliography 
 G. Bosio,  Future città dell'Impero , in "Architettura", XVI, July 1937, pp. 417–432
TO. Maraini,  Gherardo Bosio e la sua opera , in "Illustrazione Toscana e dell'Etruria", 9, September 1941, pp. 18–21
 G. Bridges,  Ricordo di Gherardo Bosio , in "Stile", July 1941, pp 14–19
 G. Carapelli,  Gli operatori, in Edilizia in Toscana fra le due guerre , Edifir, Florence 1994, pp 214–215
  Gherardo Bosio architetto fiorentino 1903–1941 , edited by C. Cresti, Pontecorboli, Florence 1996
 P. Malentacchi,  Scheda su Gherardo Bosio  in  Guida agli archivi di architetti e ingegneri del Novecento in Toscana , edited by E. Insabato, C. Ghelli, pp. 77–83
 R. Renzi,  Gherardo Bosio. Le Ville , Alinea, Florence 2010

References

1903 births
1941 deaths
Architects from Florence
20th-century Italian architects
20th-century Italian engineers
Italian urban planners
Deaths from cancer in Tuscany
University of Florence alumni
Italian expatriates in Ethiopia